NYO may refer to:
NYO, the IATA airport code the Stockholm Skavsta Airport in Sweden
NYO, the railway station code the Nayagaon railway station in India
NYO, the National Youth Orchestra of Canada
NYO, the National Youth Orchestra of China
NYO, the National Youth Orchestra of the United States of America
NYO, the National Youth Orchestra of Great Britain

See also
"Nyo" is one of the Japanese onomatopoeias meaning "Meow". e.g. in the anime Di Gi Charat